Ralf Lauruschkat (born 27 January 1950) is a German former field hockey player. He competed in the men's tournament at the 1976 Summer Olympics.

References

External links
 

1950 births
Living people
German male field hockey players
Olympic field hockey players of West Germany
Field hockey players at the 1976 Summer Olympics
Sportspeople from Leverkusen
20th-century German people